The Steuben Monument is a public art work by Swiss-American artist J. Otto Schweizer, located on the north side of Milwaukee, Wisconsin.  The bronze equestrian sculpture depicts Baron Friedrich Wilhelm von Steuben in his Revolutionary War uniform. It is located at the intersection of West Lisbon Avenue, Lloyd Street, and North Sherman Boulevard.

References

1921 establishments in Wisconsin
1921 sculptures
Bronze sculptures in Wisconsin
Equestrian statues in Wisconsin
Military monuments and memorials in the United States
Monuments and memorials in Wisconsin
Outdoor sculptures in Milwaukee
Sculptures of men in Wisconsin